Alfred Karibongi was the third Bishop of Hanuato'o: he was elected in July 2007; and consecrated and installed on 30 September 2007. He retired effective 16 August 2020.

References

Living people
21st-century Anglican bishops in Oceania
Anglican bishops of Hanuato'o
Year of birth missing (living people)